Nilda Ismael do Nascimento (born 25 March 1972), commonly known as Nilda or Nildinha, is a Brazilian former football midfielder who played for the Brazil women's national football team.

She represented Brazil at the 1996 Summer Olympics, but did not play. At the club level, she played for Saad EC and Swedish club Hammarby IF DFF.

See also
 Brazil at the 1996 Summer Olympics

References

External links
 
 Damallsvenskan player profile 
 

1972 births
Living people
Brazilian women's footballers
Place of birth missing (living people)
Footballers at the 1996 Summer Olympics
Olympic footballers of Brazil
Women's association football midfielders
Brazil women's international footballers
Brazilian expatriate women's footballers
Brazilian expatriate sportspeople in Sweden
Expatriate women's footballers in Sweden
Saad Esporte Clube (women) players